The 1978 Wake Forest Demon Deacons football team was an American football team that represented Wake Forest University during the 1978 NCAA Division I-A football season. In their first season under head coach John Mackovic, the Demon Deacons compiled a 1–10 record and finished in sixth place in the Atlantic Coast Conference.

Schedule

Team leaders

References

Wake Forest
Wake Forest Demon Deacons football seasons
Wake Forest Demon Deacons football